Kiley Boynton is an American female acrobatic gymnast. With Ryan Ward, she was awarded the bronze medal in the 2014 Acrobatic Gymnastics World Championships.

Along with her now-retired partner Ryan Ward, the pair were jointly named as acrobatics 'Athlete of the Year' by USA Gymnastics in 2014. She was a member of the AcroArmy, an acrobatic gymnastics group, which finished in third place on Season 9 of America's Got Talent in 2014.

Her sister Aisley Boynton is also an acrobatic gymnast in a mixed pair with Maxim  Sedochenkov.

References 

1998 births
Living people
American acrobatic gymnasts
Female acrobatic gymnasts
Medalists at the Acrobatic Gymnastics World Championships
21st-century American women